Rautjärvi is a municipality in the South Karelia region of Finland. The municipality has a population of 
which 
is water. The population density is
. More than half of Rautjärvi's residents live in Simpele, the administrative center of the municipality.

The neighboring municipalities of Rautjärvi are Parikkala and Ruokolahti, while to the east is the Russian border. The municipality is unilingually Finnish. Rautjärvi is mostly well known as the birthplace of legendary sniper Simo Häyhä, a hero of the Winter War of World War II.

History 
Rautjärvi was first mentioned in 1560 as Rauda Järffui as one of the villages of Jääski. It became a part of the Ruokolahti parish after its establishment in 1572. The municipality of Rautjärvi was founded in the year of 1861. A few years prior in 1859, the Rautjärvi parish had founded an independent church.

After the Winter War ended with the signing of the Moscow Peace Treaty on March 12, 1940, almost half of Rautjärvi (198.9 km2) was handed over to the Soviet Union in accordance with the treaty.

The municipality of Simpele was consolidated with Rautjärvi in 1973, becoming its new administrative center.

Rautjärvi's wooden church, completed in 1881, was destroyed in a fire on Christmas Day in 2022. The fire broke out in the middle of the worship, but all 30 people in the building got out safely.

Villages 
The villages of Rautjärvi are inclusive of: Haakanala, Hallilanmäki, Hiivaniemi, Hinkkala, Hynnilä, Ilmee, Jurvala, Kalpiala, Kekäleniemi, Kokkola, Kopsala, Korjola, Korpijärvi, Lankila, Latvajärvi, Miettilä, Niskapietilä, Partila, Pirhola, Purnujärvi, Rautjärvi, Siisiälä, Simpele, Torsansalo, Uimola, Untamo, Viimola, Vähikkälä

Noteworthy attractions 
 Hiitolanjoki, a river that descends from Lake Ladoga
 Haukkavuori, the highest place in South Karelia
 Iivanansaari, an island which also serves as the burial place of Jussi Reinikainen
 Pirunkirkko, several rock and stone formations
 Laiko
 Miettilä Historical Reserve Garrison, historic barracks which were constructed in the years of 1881–1883.
 Rautjärvi local history exhibition
 Kollaa Museum, a museum which documents the Battle of Kollaa
 Niskapietiläntie, a road connecting the villages of Rautjärvi and Miettilä
 Rautjärvi church, completed in the year of 1881
 Simpele church, completed in the year of 1933

Notable individuals
Hannes Pulkkinen, elementary school teacher and a Member of the Parliament of Finland
Jesse Joronen, professional footballer who plays as a goalkeeper for Serie B club Brescia.
Johannes Häyhä, teacher and writer
Jorma Kosunen, Finnish Border Guard colonel and former Frontier school (later the Border and Coast Guard Academy) leader
Jouni Vento, ice hockey player
Karl Henrik Jakob Ignatius, priest and writer
Lauri Vilkko, Olympic pentathlete
Lea Piltti, opera singer
Martti Siisiäinen, professor and researcher
Matti Mononen, pole vaulter
Olli Pajari, Member of the Parliament
Simo Häyhä, notable hero of the Winter War of World War II.
Yrjö Roiha, missionary

References

External links

Municipality of Rautjärvi – Official website 

 
Populated places established in 1871
1871 establishments in Finland